Epigelasma is a genus of moths in the family Geometridae described by Prout in 1930.

Species
Some species of this genus are:
Epigelasma alba Viette, 1970
Epigelasma befasy Viette, 1981
Epigelasma corrupta Herbulot, 1955
Epigelasma crenifera Herbulot, 1970
Epigelasma disjuncta Herbulot, 1972
Epigelasma frigida Herbulot, 1972
Epigelasma herbuloti Viette, 1980
Epigelasma hispida Herbulot, 1972
Epigelasma holochroa Herbulot, 1972
Epigelasma lutea Viette, 1970
Epigelasma meloui Prout, 1930
Epigelasma nobilis Herbulot, 1955
Epigelasma occidentalis Herbulot, 1972
Epigelasma olsoufieffi Herbulot, 1972
Epigelasma perineti Herbulot, 1972
Epigelasma praenuntia Herbulot, 1972
Epigelasma radiata Herbulot, 1972
Epigelasma rhodostigma Herbulot, 1955
Epigelasma rufifrons Herbulot, 1972
Epigelasma simplaria Herbulot, 1972
Epigelasma triplicifascia (Prout, 1912)
Epigelasma tulear Herbulot, 1972
Epigelasma viridibasis Herbulot, 1972

References

Geometridae